Avraham "Abir" Kara (born 27 October 1983) is an Israeli businessman and politician who served as a member of the Knesset from 2021 to 2022. Initially representing Yamina, he broke away to form the Economic Freedom Party in September 2022. His new party failed to win a seat in the November 2022 elections.

Biography
Kara used his bar mitzvah money to open a flower stall, later expanding the business to several branches. After completing his military service in the Israel Defense Forces he opened a horse ranch, and later ran franchises of a waffle bar and a pizza restaurant. In 2006 he was sentenced to 240 hours of community service for swearing at a police officer when he was caught putting up illegal election signs. He also admitted to uprooting olive trees owned by Palestinians.

In 2019 Kara and another restaurant owner established 'I am Shulman' group, which protests against how the government treats self-employed workers. In less than a month its Facebook group had grown to 120,000 members. Having turned down the opportunity to join Likud, claiming that groups including the Histadrut union held too much power over the party, prior to the 2021 elections he joined Yamina and was placed seventh on its list. He was elected to the Knesset as the party won seven seats and was appointed Deputy Minister in the Prime Minister's Office. After Yamina joined the Zionist Spirit alliance, Kara announced that he would leave the party on 26 August 2022. Kara launched a new party on 4 September 2022 called the Economic Freedom Party, a libertarian party that focuses on expanding personal and economic freedom. The party received just 0.33% of the vote in the 2022 elections, resulting in Kara losing his seat.

References

External links

1983 births
Living people
Deputy ministers of Israel
Israeli businesspeople
Jewish Israeli politicians
Members of the 24th Knesset (2021–2022)
Yamina politicians